Dasht-e Kenar (also Romanized as Dasht-e Kenār) is a village in Dorudzan Rural District, Dorudzan District, Marvdasht County, Fars Province, Iran. At the 2006 census, its population was 54, in 14 families.

References 

Populated places in Marvdasht County